The functional programming language Lisp is the second-oldest high-level programming language with direct descendants and closely related dialects still in widespread use today. The language Fortran is older by one year. Lisp, like Fortran, has changed a lot since its early days, and many dialects have existed over its history. Today, the most widely known general-purpose Lisp dialects are Common Lisp and Scheme.

Timeline

References

Lisp